Kenneth Jack Webber (March 2, 1899 – April 9, 1983) was a civil servant and political figure in New Brunswick, Canada. A Liberal Party member, he represented Charlotte County in the Legislative Assembly of New Brunswick from 1960 to 1967.

He was born in St. Stephen, New Brunswick, the son of John D. Webber and Emma Jacobs. In 1919, Webber married Edna Frances Hartin. He was a customs officer for Saint Stephen from 1923 to 1960. Webber served in the Canadian Army during World War II. He was Minister of Labour in the province's Executive Council from 1960 to 1967. Webber ran unsuccessfully for reelection in 1967. He died in 1983.

References 

 Canadian Parliamentary Guide, 1961, PG Normandin

1899 births
1983 deaths
20th-century Canadian civil servants
Canadian military personnel of World War I
People from St. Stephen, New Brunswick
New Brunswick Liberal Association MLAs